João dos Santos (born 11 February 1909, date of death unknown) was a Portuguese footballer who played for Vitória Setúbal and the Portugal national team, as forward.

International career 
Santos made his debut for the national team 24 January 1926 against Czechoslovakia in a 1–1 draw in Porto, just 16 years old and scored Portugals one goal. He was a member of Portugals Squad in the 1928 Football Olympic Tournament, and played one game against Yugoslavia (2-1 win). Santos gained 11 caps and scored 4 goals.

International goals

References

External links 
 
 
 

1909 births
Vitória F.C. players
Portugal international footballers
Portuguese footballers
Primeira Liga players
Olympic footballers of Portugal
Footballers at the 1928 Summer Olympics
Year of death missing
Place of birth missing
Association football forwards